Chen Wei (born 19 February 1993 in Anhui) is a Chinese footballer who currently plays for Suzhou Dongwu in the China League One.

Club career
Chen Wei started his professional football career in 2011 when he joined Jiangsu Youth for the 2011 China League Two campaign. Failing to join Jiangsu Sainty, he moved to another Chinese Super League club Shanghai Shenxin in January 2014. On 18 April 2015, he made his Super League debut in a 4–1 home defeat against Changchun Yatai, coming on as a substitute for Zhang Wentao in the 67th minute. He was sent to the reserved team in 2018.

On 11 January 2019, Chen transferred to League Two side Suzhou Dongwu.

Career statistics 
Statistics accurate as of match played 31 December 2019.

References

1993 births
Living people
Chinese footballers
Footballers from Anhui
Shanghai Shenxin F.C. players
Suzhou Dongwu F.C. players
Chinese Super League players
China League One players
China League Two players
Association football defenders